Shadowheart is the debut album by Finnish symphonic/folk metal band Kivimetsän Druidi. It was released through Century Media on October 20, 2008.

Track listing
Tracks 1-11 Published By Magic Arts Publishing.
 "Northwind - Prelude" - 1:29
 "Blacksmith" - 6:01 (Jenni Onishko, Joni Koskinen, Antti Koskinen, Antti Rinkinen)
 "Jäässä Varttunut" ("Grown Up Within Ice") - 5:51 (Onishko, A. Koskinen, J. Koskinen)
 "Halls of Shadowheart" - 4:36 (A. Koskinen, J. Koskinen, Leeni-Maria Hovila)
 "Pedon Loitsu" ("The Spell Of The Beast") - 5:57 (A. Koskinen, J. Koskinen, Lukas Pearsall)
 "Burden" - 4:31 (Onishko, J. Koskinen, Ville Ryöti)
 "The Tyrant" - 5:44 (A. Koskinen, J. Koskinen, Onishko)
 "Tiarnäch - Verinummi" ("Bloodmoor") - 2:33 (Hovila, J. Koskinen, A. Koskinen) 
 "Verivala" ("Bloodoath") - 4:01 (Hovila, Ryöti, J. Koskinen, A. Koskinen) 
 "Korpin Laulu" ("Raven's Song") - 5:19 (Hovila, J. Koskinen, A. Koskinen)
 "Mustan Valtikan Aika" ("The Era Of The Black Scepter") - 7:00 (Rinkinen, J. Koskinen. A. Koskinen)
 "Viimeinen Peikkokuningas" ("The Last Of The Troll Kings") - 2:22 
 "Leaves" - 4:42

Tracks 2 and 3 are re-recordings of songs from the "Taottu" EP.
Tracks 5 and 11 are re-recordings of songs from the "Mustan Valtikan Aika" EP.
Tracks 6 and 7 are re-recordings of songs from "The New Chapter" demo.
Track 12 and 13 are bonus tracks. Track 13 is a cover of a song by The Gathering

Personnel

Kivimetsän Druidi
Leeni-Maria Hovila: Female Vocal
Joni Koskinen: Lead Guitar, Male Vocal, Choir Vocal
Antti Rinkinen: Rhythm Guitar
Antti Koskinen: Keyboards, Synthesizers, Choir Vocal
Simo Lehtonen: Bass, Male Backing Vocal
Atte Martinen: Drums, Percussion

Additional Personnel
Janne Virkki, Olle Korte, Pasi Itäniemi, Vesa Virtanen, Ville Konka, Esa Orjatsalo: Choir

Production
Arranged By Kivimetsän Druidi
Produced, Engineered & Mixed By Esa Orjsatsalo
Digital Editing By Artturi Laukkanen & Timo Kuismanen 
Mastered By Svante Forsback

External links
 Kivimetsän Druidi Official Homepage

References

2008 albums
Kivimetsän Druidi albums
Century Media Records albums